Øystein Carlsen (born 30 April 1973) is a Norwegian speed skater. He was born in Bærum, a grandson of Armand Carlsen, and represented the club Oslo SK. He competed in short track speed skating at the 1994 Winter Olympics.

References

External links

1973 births
Living people
Sportspeople from Bærum
Norwegian male speed skaters
Norwegian male short track speed skaters
Olympic short track speed skaters of Norway
Short track speed skaters at the 1994 Winter Olympics
20th-century Norwegian people